Ma Long (born 20 October 1988) is a Chinese table tennis player and the reigning Olympic singles champion. Widely regarded as the greatest table tennis player of all time, he is the first and only male player to complete a career Double Grand Slam as the Olympic gold medalist in men's singles in 2016 and 2020. He held the ranking of number 1 for a total of 64 months (and 34 consecutive months from March 2015), the most by any male in the history of table tennis. He is also champion in World Championships in men's singles in 2015, 2017 and 2019. His records led the International Table Tennis Federation to nickname him as "The Dictator" and "The Dragon" (derived from his name, Lóng, which represents the zodiac year of his birth). Since 2014, he has been the captain of the Chinese national table tennis men's team.

Career

Early career

After winning both the Asian and World Junior Championships, Ma became the youngest world champion at the age of 17 after he participated in the 2006 Bremen World Team Championship. He developed his foundations under the tutelage of Wang Hao and former Chinese National Team coach Ma Kai Xuan before studying under Qin Zhijian. Before turning 22, he had great success in singles, reaching the finals of 11 ITTF World Tour tournaments (winning 8). He won the Asian Cup and World Tour Grand Finals twice, and also made it to the final round of the Asian Championships two times (losing to former coach Wang Hao in 2007 and winning in 2009). In addition, he played in the finals of the China National Games and All China Championships, losing both matches to Wang.
Despite being the No. 1 player in the world for much of 2010–2012 stretch, he was not chosen to represent China at the 2012 Olympics due to his temporary dip in ratings that happened after a 560-day win streak on the ITTF World Tour. He suffered career setback by Japan's Koki Niwa in six games at the Asian Olympic Qualification Tournament, then lost to Lee Sang-su at the 2012 Korea Open, 4–1. As players were selected based on the ITTF World Rankings, he was not given an opportunity to win an Olympic medal in singles at the time when he was widely accepted as the best table tennis player in the world.

Chinese National Team coach Liu Guoliang remarked that Ma had all the tools necessary to be the best, yet at major tournaments, he had so far lacked sufficient mental toughness to play to his full ability under pressure. This was evident in his losses to Timo Boll and Vladimir Samsonov in the 2008 and 2009 World Cup semifinals, and to Wang Hao (4–1, 4–2, 4–2) in the semifinals of three consecutive World Championships (2009, 2011, and 2013). Although he performed well on the ITTF World Tour and in domestic competitions, he didn't make it to the final of the World Championships in his first four attempts. This led to many believing he was inferior to compatriot Zhang Jike, who completed his Grand Slam in just over a year.

2013–2015: Increasing consistency

After his third defeat to Wang Hao at the WTTC in 2013, Ma had a successful year. He won the China Open at two different locations (beating Wang and then Xu Xin in the final), the Asian Championships (for the third time), and the China National Games in a full-stretch match against Fan Zhendong. However, Xu defeated him 4–3 at the end of the year at the ITTF World Tour Grand Finals.
In March 2014, he won the Asian Cup for the fourth time, again defeating Fan in seven games. At the 2014 WTTC, he did not lose a single game. In the final against Germany, he played a pivotal role, beating Timo Boll in the opening match and defeating Dimitrij Ovtcharov for the win. For his efforts, he was awarded the Victor Barna Award as the tournament's best player. He then won the China Open for the fifth time, which tied him with Wang Liqin for the most ever. Ma's first encounter with Zhang Jike at a Grand Slam competition came in October 2014, at the World Cup in Düsseldorf. Although he was leading 3–2 in sets, Ma lost the match, saving two match points in the deciding game but still losing 10–12. This led to further criticism of his inability to come through on the biggest stages at the toughest moments. In November, he reached the final of the Chinese National Championships, but was defeated by Fan, 4–2, again ending the year on a sour note.

However, 2015 would prove to be Ma's year. He won the Kuwait Open, beating Xu Xin 4–1 in the final, and then the German Open, getting revenge on Zhang Jike in an intense final after being down 3–1. But his biggest win came at the 2015 WTTC, where he did not drop more than one set until the final where he defeated tournament sensation Fang Bo in six games. This was a huge breakthrough for him, as his only other major singles title was the 2012 World Cup. After a surprising 4–1 loss to Shang Kun at the Japan Open, Ma won the China Open for a record sixth time, winning 4–1 against Xu Xin. In September, he led Ningbo over Fan Zhendong and Bayi to win the Chinese Super League championship. Injuries prevented him from competing at the Asian Championships, but he participated in the World Cup in Halmstad in October. Following a dropped set to Omar Assar in the round of 16, he did not lose another game in the competition, allowing his opponents to score an average of 6 points per set the rest of the tournament. He did not participate in the last two World Tour tournaments of the year, again due to injuries, but still was seeded first at the World Tour Grand Finals because he had won 3 other World Tour tournaments. In the final, he faced Fan again, winning 11–9 in the last game of a full-stretch match, coming back from being down 3–2 in sets (after being up 2–0), including down 8–6 in the sixth and 6–2 in the decider (when he won 8 points in a row). In 2015, Ma only lost once in international competition and just five times overall.

2016: Grand Slam

Ma long won the German Open in January 2016, going undefeated until the final, where he beat Vladimir Samsonov 4–1. While helping China win the 2016 WTTC over Japan in Kuala Lumpur, he didn't lose a game, which extended his unbeaten streak to three straight World Team Championships. In March, he reached the final of the Kuwait Open, but was defeated 4–1 by Zhang Jike, who had recently defeated him 5–4 in China's Trials for the 2016 WTTC. However, a week later, he won the Qatar Open by defeating Fan in five games, breaking Wang Liqin's record for most ITTF World Tour singles titles by a Chinese player. In April, he directly qualified for the Olympic Singles in Rio by winning his section of the Asian Olympic Qualification Tournament, taking down Zhang and then Fan in six and five games respectively. After this, Ma remained world No. 1, despite not participating in another international competition until the middle of June. Within a span of two weeks, Xu Xin beat him twice, first in the semi-finals of the Japan Open (his second consecutive loss at that station dating back to last year) in six games, and then in the full-stretch final of the Korea Open (Xu had also beaten him the last time he participated at Korea, in the final in 2013). This was the shortest time between international losses for Ma since 2012 (when he lost to Niwa and Lee).

At the Olympics in Rio, he automatically qualified to third round in the singles due to his No. 1 ranking. He swept Denmark's Jonathan Groth, but experienced a scare in the next round when he went down 2–0 to Korea's Jeoung Young-sik. However, he recovered and won the next four games to advance to the quarterfinals. His next opponent was Quadri Aruna from Nigeria, who had upset Timo Boll and Chuang Chih-yuan to become the first African player to make it to the singles quarterfinals at the Olympics. Ma beat him in four straight games to face Jun Mizutani, Japan's top player, in the semi-finals. The first three games were all 11–5 wins by Ma, but Mizutani took the next game 11–7 and the fifth 12–10. Ma won the sixth, again 11–5, to set up a historic final match against reigning Olympic champion Zhang Jike. Their second meeting at a Grand Slam final was very unexpected: Ma took the gold by overpowering Zhang in a 4–0 rout (14–12, 11–5, 11–4, 11–4), the first four-game sweep in an Olympic singles final.

By winning the gold medal in Rio, Ma etched himself a place as an immortal figure in table tennis history. He became the fifth male player to complete the Grand Slam, and the second male to be the defending champion of all three Grand Slam competitions simultaneously (Zhang being the first). He was the second male (after Kong Linghui) to win the ITTF World Tour Grand Finals and the three Grand Slam titles (dubbed a "Full House" in an ITTF article), being the first to win them all consecutively (therefore being the first male to be the reigning champion of all four at the same time) and the fastest to complete it (in just 467 days). In addition, he became the first male to have won every important singles competition possible, from majors to the ITTF World Tour to domestic competitions. The only other player who has done so is Deng Yaping.

As the current World Champion, he was slated to participate in the 2016 World Cup in Saarbrücken, Germany, but withdrew a month before the competition, citing exhaustion in addition to waist and knee pain. He did, however, play in the China Open in Chengdu, where his reasons for withdrawing from the World Cup were brought to light: he barely survived a seven-game semifinal with Zhang Jike and was crushed in a sweep by Fan Zhendong in the finals. This marked the first time since the 2008 China Open that Ma lost in four games on the ITTF World Tour, excluding a withdraw from the 2014 Qatar Open due to injury. In December, Ma participated in the ITTF World Tour Grand Finals in Doha, Qatar, his last international event of the year. Although he entered as the first seed, he received a scare in the round of 16 from host nation's Li Ping, a former Chinese National Team member, going down 1–2. However, he won the next three games to take the match in six games, and beat both Wong Chun Ting and Jeoung Young-sik 4–0 to face Fan in the final for the second straight year. Just like the previous year, Ma clearly started better, winning the first three, before Fan won the next two, including three championship points, to stay in the match. But despite displaying wonderful resilience and brilliance under pressure, the 19-year-old could not extend the match to seven games. The Dragon closed the year by winning the 2016 ITTF World Tour Grand Finals, his record 5th title in the event, more than any other player. This accomplishment also marked his fifth consecutive major title won. However, that success did not carry over to domestic competitions. Despite his team, Shandong Weiqiao, being ranked No. 1 for much of the 2016 Chinese Super League, they were defeated 3–1 in the semi-finals by Bazhou and rising star Liang Jingkun, who beat Ma 3–1 to decide the match. For his accomplishments in 2016, Ma was named male athlete of the year at the China Central Television (CCTV) Sports Awards Gala in Beijing.

2017

Ma began 2017 by winning the Qatar Open in February for the second year in a row, defeating Fan Zhendong 4–1 in the final. However, Fan would get his revenge at China's trials for the 2017 WTTC, dubbed "the Marvellous 12." Ma and Fan, No. 1 and No. 2 in the world respectively, each had 9 wins after the first 11-round stage, but Fan beat Ma in their head-to-head in an exciting three-game match that went down to the wire (6–11, 11–5, 12–14). Unfortunately, Ma injured his waist during his final match against Lin Gaoyuan and had to withdraw from the trials, missing out on one of the three guaranteed spots in the 2017 WTTC. The Dragon looked to bounce back at the Asian Championships held in Wuxi in April and, while he did contribute to a Chinese victory in the team competition, he lost to Korea's Jeong Sang-eun 3–1 in the men's singles round of 32, which was the biggest upset of the tournament.

Despite his up-and-down start to 2017, Ma was given the chance to participate at the world championships held in Düsseldorf from late May to early June. Entering as the No. 1 seed, Ma progressed through the first four rounds without too much trouble, except for a tough six-game match against Sweden's Anton Källberg, who he had never played before. In the quarterfinals, he faced the host nation's Timo Boll, who had played an excellent tournament in front of his home crowd. He then quickly booked his place in the final by sweeping teammate Xu Xin, who was making his second appearance in a WTTC singles semi-final (he was also swept by Zhang Jike in 2013). The 2017 WTTC men's singles final did not disappoint. Ma and Fan faced off once again in a major competition, having played each other at least once in every major within the last two years except the Olympics. Fan raced to a 7-1 lead in the first set and took it 11-7. However, Ma quickly came back to win the next three games (11-3, 11-6, 11-8) and it looked like another five or six game win for the World Champion. But as he had done in their past encounters, the fearless 20-year old rose to the occasion. He won the fifth and sixth games (11-5, 11-7) to push the match to a seventh game, the first seven game WTTC men's singles final since Ma Lin's and Wang Liqin's legendary clash in 2007. Fan won the first two points of the set, but Ma raced to a 6-3 lead. Unwilling to give in, Fan leveled it at 7-7, then won the next two points on Ma's serve. Down 7-9 with Fan serving, things did not look good for the Dragon, but he reeled off three in a row to have match point. Afterwards, China's head coach Liu Guoliang remarked that if Fan had chosen a different serve at that crucial juncture at 9-7, he would have had a better chance. But unlike the 2015 Grand Finals, Ma was not able to capitalize with his serve at 10-9 in the seventh. After two loops, Fan hit a big smash to Ma's wide forehand, which tied it at 10-10. Unfortunately for Fan, he was not able to capitalize with his serve either; his third ball banana flick hit the net and went long. Leading 11-10, Ma served short to Fan's wide backhand, then smashed it wide down the line to his forehand, securing the point and the title.The win put him on par with Zhang Jike and Ma Lin for the most Grand Slam titles (5) and he became the first male with 10 major titles. This also marked his sixth consecutive major title won. Since 2015, he had won every major competition he had participated in.

In June, Ma won the Japan Open in Tokyo, beating Xu (who had defeated him there last year) in 6 games and Fan in 5 on his way to the title. This was the first time he won in Japan, meaning he has won at every major station on the ITTF World Tour (Kuwait, Germany, China, Qatar, Japan, and Korea).

From late August to early September, Ma represented Beijing at the 2017 China National Games in three events: singles, doubles, and team. In the team event group stage, Ma and Beijing were put in the same division as defending champions PLA, led by Fan Zhendong. When Beijing and PLA went head to head, Ma beat Zhou Yu 3–1, but was brutally swept by Fan as PLA took the match 3–1 and finished first in the division. However, Beijing still qualified for the knockout stage by winning their other two matches and finishing second in the group. In the team quarterfinals, they faced Lin Gaoyuan and Guangdong. Ma beat Zhou Qihao 3–0, but Beijing still found themselves on the brink of elimination going into the fourth match. Ma lost to Lin in five games (9–11, 12–10, 11–5, 12–14, 4–11) and Beijing bowed out of the team tournament, a disappointing result considering they had finished 3rd in the team event in the last two National Games. The 2011 World Champion men's doubles partnership was reunited as Ma and Xu Xin were paired together in the doubles event. They cruised to the final, sweeping all of their opponents along the way, to face defending champions Fan and Zhou Yu from PLA. The match was epic and went the full seven games. Ma and Xu narrowly lost the final game by the smallest margin (9–11), settling for silver as Fan and Zhou defended their title. After the match, both pairs acknowledged that Xu had been affected by injuries sustained from playing deep into the team event, which he won with Shanghai.

The injuries eventually caused Xu to withdraw from the singles event the next day. Similarly to the doubles, Ma navigated the singles pretty easily, never dropping more than a game until the final. There, he met Fan yet again, who had received a walk over in the semi-finals due to Xu's injuries. After winning the first game, Ma found himself down 2–1, as Fan controlled the rallies with his backhand receive and backhand punch. However, Ma adjusted his tactics and Fan was unable to respond appropriately, leading to a 4–2 win and a successful defense of the men's singles title for the Dragon. With the win, he became the second male to win two singles titles at the China National Games (Wang Tao in 1987 and 1997) and is the first to win two in a row. He has played in the last three singles finals at the National Games, the first player to do so.

The next major competition that Ma participated in was 2017 World Cup, held in Liège in October. As the first seed, Ma automatically advanced to the knockout stage, where he recorded consecutive five-game wins over Omar Assar and Koki Niwa. In the semi-finals, he faced Timo Boll, who had defeated Lin Gaoyuan in an epic seven-game thriller where the German had won despite being down 10–4 in the final game. The match between Boll and Ma was significant because the two had played each other in the 2008 World Cup semi-finals, also in Liège. Even more coincidentally, the match mirrored their encounter nine years before, with Ma taking a 3–1 lead, then Boll taking the next two games to force a seventh. Just like his match with Zhang Jike in 2014 World Cup final, Ma found himself down 10–8 in the deciding game, but managed to tie it up at 10–10. Multiple histories repeated themselves, as Boll took the next two points to add to his legendary track record in Liège (where he had consecutively defeated the Chinese trio of Ma Lin, Wang Liqin, and Wang Hao to win the 2005 World Cup and reached the final in 2008 by beating Ma). The loss was a devastating blow to Ma, and that was visible during the third-place match against France's Simon Gauzy. Ma lost two of the first three games before recovering to win the match in six games. This was his last international competition in 2017, because his wife was expecting a baby. He still played in the Chinese Super League, but did not travel outside of China to play any tournaments. His son was born on 9 December 2017.

2018

At the beginning of 2018, Ma's world ranking dropped to 9th as a result of being inactive. The ITTF had previously announced that they were implementing a new ranking system at the start of the new year, and the new system gave more weight to activity than to a player's playing strength. Because of this, the Dragon not only lost his number 1 ranking, which he had held for the last 34 months, but he also dropped out of the top five in the ITTF world ranking for the first time since 2011. Despite being lower ranked, Ma made his presence felt at the 2018 World Team Cup held in London in late February. He went undefeated in both singles and doubles throughout the entire tournament and helped China sweep Japan in the final. In March, Ma won the German Open for the fifth time over a very strong field. He defeated Maharu Yoshimura, Jun Mizutani, Timo Boll, Wong Chun Ting, and compatriot Xu Xin en route to his 25th ITTF World Tour singles title, which brought his world ranking up to 6th.

Due to the new ITTF ranking system, Team China was not seeded first at the 2018 WTTC held in Halmstad from late April to early May. Nevertheless, Ma and his Chinese teammates did not experience any difficulties in the group stage, collectively going 15–0 to finish first in Group B. However, he survived a scare in the quarterfinals when Austria's Robert Gardos took the Dragon to a full five games in their first ever encounter. Ma reasserted his dominance throughout the rest of the tournament, defeating Sweden's Mattias Karlsson in straight sets in front of the latter's home crowd and then sweeping Timo Boll in the final as China swept top-seeded Germany to claim their 21st title in the event.

After China's victory in Halmstad, Ma won the China Open, defeating Lin Yun-Ju, Wang Chuqin, Liang Jingkun, Lim Jong-hoon, and Fan Zhendong to win his 26th ITTF World Tour singles title. However, this would be his last successful singles event for nine months. At the Japan Open, he was defeated in six games by rising Japanese star Tomokazu Harimoto and although he won the doubles title with Xu Xin at the Bulgaria Open in August, he lost to Liam Pitchford in the men's singles round of 32. It was discovered that Ma had a knee injury, something that would keep him out of all tournaments for the rest of 2018. These included the Austrian Open, the World Cup, the Swedish Open, and the World Tour Grand Finals.

2019

Ma's injuries persisted into 2019, preventing him from participating in the Marvellous 12, the Chinese qualifier for the 2019 WTTC in Budapest in April. Despite this, he was still included in the Chinese lineup for the championships in both singles and doubles. His long-awaited return to international competition came at the Qatar Open in late March. It wasn't clear how well he would play due to his seven-month absence from the game, and it showed when he needed six games to defeat Tristan Flore in his opening match. But after that, he appeared to be in good form. He swept Timo Boll and Jun Mizutani consecutively, then won a hard-fought six-game match against Xu Xin in the semi-finals. In the final against compatriot Lin Gaoyuan, he overcame a 0–2 deficit, including 2–7 in the fifth game, to win in six games. Immediately after winning the match, he posed in front of the camera, appearing to wipe the dust off his racket to indicate he was fine even after being inactive for so long. The victory tied him with Vladimir Samsonov for the most ITTF World Tour singles titles by a male player with 27.

However, not all was going perfectly for Ma Long, as he suffered his first loss to Fan Zhendong in international competition in years in the final of the 2019 Asian Cup, which led many to believe the Dragon's reign would soon come to an end. Though it was possible that they could soon play each other again at the World Championships, this proved not to be the case as Fan was defeated 4–2 by lower-ranked compatriot Liang Jingkun in one of the many upsets of the tournament, who was then subsequently defeated by Ma Long 4–1 in the semifinals; the second Chinese player he'd eliminated in the tournament in addition to Lin Gaoyuan. In the final, the Dragon overpowered Sweden's Mattias Falck 4–1 to win his third consecutive World Championship, becoming the first player since Wang Liqin to win three such titles and the first since Zhuang Zedong (in 1961, 1963, and 1965) to win them consecutively.

2020 
Ma won runner-up in the 2020 World Cup, losing to Fan Zhendong in the finals. In the semi-finals, Ma was trailing 3–1 against Harimoto before he called a time-out in game 5 and switched to a high-toss serve that Harimoto had trouble reading. As a result, Ma was able to come back for a 4–3 victory. However, Ma closed this year by winning to Fan Zhendong 4–1 in the finals of ITTF World Tour finals extending his record to the 6th title in the event.

2021 
In May, Ma played in the China Olympic scrimmages. He lost 4–3 to Zhou Qihao in the semi-finals of the first leg of scrimmage. In mid-May, Ma was selected alongside Fan Zhendong to represent China in the men's singles event of the Tokyo Olympics. Shortly after, Ma was upset 4–2 by Xu Chenhao in the quarter-finals of the second leg of the scrimmage.

In June, Ma sat down with WTT to conduct an interview on his Olympic preparations. He stated that the most important preparation for him going into Tokyo was mental preparation and that he had to be even better mentally prepared than he was in London 2012 and Rio 2016.

At the 2020 Summer Olympics, Ma beat compatriot Fan Zhendong 4–2 in the final, making him the first player in history to win consecutive gold medals in the men's singles event. After the match, Fan called Ma the greatest player of this generation. During the 2020 Summer Olympics, he also became the first male table tennis player to have won five Olympic gold medals after beating Timo Boll 3-1, maintaining China's 100% win rate for the men's teams event.

In September, Ma withdrew from the men's singles event at the China National Games, citing the tight schedule due to the Tokyo Olympics and mandatory 21-day quarantine. Ma led Beijing to the silver medal in the team event, losing deuce in the fifth game to Fan Zhendong in the finals. Ma held six match points against Fan, but Fan came back with the help of four net balls in the last eight points.

Personal life 
Ma Long married his girlfriend Xia Lu, from Nanjing, Jiangsu. On 10 December 2017, he disclosed the birth of his son on Sina Weibo.

Ma has a close platonic relationship with fellow teammate Liu Shiwen and cried when she won the 2019 World Championships.

Career records
Singles (as of October 2022)
 Olympic Games: winner (2016, 2020)
 World Championships: winner (2015, 2017, 2019); SF (2009, 2011, 2013); round of 16 (2007).
 World Cup: winner (2012, 2015); runner-up (2014, 2020); third place (2008, 2009, 2017).
 ITTF World Tour winner (28): Kuwait, German Open 2007; Korea, Singapore Open 2008; Danish, Kuwait, Harmony China (Suzhou), English Open 2009; German Open 2010; Harmony China (Suzhou), Austrian, Swedish Open 2011; Hungarian Open 2012; Qatar, China (Changchun), Harmony Open (Suzhou) 2013; China (Chengdu) Open 2014; Kuwait, German, China (Chengdu) Open 2015; German, Qatar Open 2016; Qatar, Japan Open 2017; German, China (Shenzhen) Open 2018; Qatar, China (Shenzhen) Open 2019. Runner-up (15): German Open 2005; Japan, Swedish Open 2007; UAE, China (Shenzhen) Open 2011; Slovenian, China (Shanghai) Open 2012; Kuwait, Korea, UAE Open 2013; Kuwait, Korea, China (Chengdu) Open 2016; Korea Open 2019; German Open 2020. 
 ITTF World Tour Grand Finals: winner (2008, 2009, 2011, 2015, 2016, 2020); runner-up (2013, 2019); SF (2007).
 Asian Games: winner (2010).
 Asian Championships: winner (2009, 2011, 2013); runner-up (2007).
 Asian Cup: winner (2008, 2009, 2011, 2014), runner-up (2019).
 China National Games: winner (2013, 2017), runner-up (2009), SF (2005).
 Chinese National Championships: winner (2011); runner-up (2004, 2007, 2014, 2020); SF (2006, 2008).
 World Junior Championships: winner (2004); QF (2003).
 Asian Junior Championships: winner (2004)

Doubles
 World Championships: winner (2011, 2019); runner-up (2009); round of 16 (2007).
 World Tour winner (23): China (Harbin) Open 2005; Slovenian Open 2006; Swedish Open 2007; Danish, Qatar, English Open 2009; Kuwait, German Open 2010; China (Shenzen), Austrian Open 2011; Slovenian, Korea, China (Shanghai) Open 2012; China (Suzhou), China (Changchun) Open 2013; China (Chengdu) Open 2014; Japan Open 2015; Japan Open, China (Chengdu) Open 2016; Japan Open 2017; German, Bulgaria Open 2018Runner-up (11): China (Shenzhen) Open 2005; Singapore Open 2006; China (Shenzhen) Open 2007; Qatar, Korea Open 2008; Kuwait Open 2009; China (Suzhou) Open 2011; Kuwait, Qatar, Korea Open 2013, China (Shenzhen) Open 2019, Qatar Open 2020.
 ITTF World Tour Grand Finals: winner (2006); runner-up (2011); SF (2007).
 Asian Games: winner (2014); SF (2006).
 Asian Championships: winner (2007, 2009); runner-up (2013); SF (2011).
 China National Games: winner (2021); runner-up (2017); SF (2005).
 Chinese National Championships: winner (2010, 2015, 2020); runner-up (2006, 2007, 2014); SF (2008).
 World Junior Championships: runner-up (2004).
 Asian Junior Championships: runner-up (2003, 2004).

Mixed doubles
 Asian Games: QF (2006).
 Asian Championships: winner (2009); SF (2005).
 China National Games: winner (2013).
 Chinese National Championships: winner (2012); runner-up (2008, 2016).
 World Junior Championships: runner-up (2003, 2004).
 Asian Junior Championships: winner (2004).

Team
 Olympic Games: 1st (2012, 2016, 2020)
 World Championships: 1st (2006, 2008, 2010, 2012, 2014, 2016, 2018, 2022).
 World Cup: 1st (2009, 2010, 2011, 2013, 2015, 2018, 2019).
 Asian Games: 1st (2006, 2010, 2014).
 Asian Championships: 1st (2005, 2007, 2009, 2011, 2013, 2015, 2017).
 China National Games: 2nd (2021); 3rd (2009, 2013)
 Chinese National Championships: 1st (2011, 2012, 2018); 3rd (2007, 2008, 2010).
 Chinese Super League: 1st (2009, 2012, 2013, 2015, 2020); 3rd (2014, 2016).
 World Junior Championships: 1st (2003, 2004).
 Asian Junior Championships: 1st (2004).
Summary of Accomplishments
 5x Olympic Champion (2 Singles, 3 Team)
 13x World Champion (3 Singles, 2 Doubles, 8 Team)
 9x World Cup winner (2 Singles, 7 Team)
 50x ITTF World Tour winner (28 Singles, 22 Doubles)
 6x ITTF World Tour Grand Finals Champion (6 Singles, 1 Doubles)
 5x Asian Games winner (1 Singles, 1 Doubles, 3 Team)
 13x Asian Champion (3 Singles, 2 Doubles, 1 Mixed Doubles, 7 Team)
 4x Asian Cup winner (4 Singles)
 4x China National Games Champion (2 Singles,1 Doubles, 1 Mixed Doubles)
 7x Chinese National Champion (1 Singles, 2 Doubles, 1 Mixed Doubles, 3 Team)
 5x Chinese Super League Champion (4 Team)
 3x World Junior Champion (1 Singles, 2 Team)
 3x Asian Junior Champion (1 Singles, 1 Mixed Doubles, 1 Team)
 2015, 2016 ITTF Male Star of the Year
 2016 CCTV Sports Personality of the Year
Head to head vs. other notable players (December 2004 – present)
(bold indicates a Chinese teammate)
 Timo Boll: 16–5
 Chen Chien-An: 3–0
 Chen Qi: 19–2
 Chuang Chih-Yuan: 17–2
 Mattias Falck: 4–0
 Fan Zhendong: 23–11
 Fang Bo: 10–2
 Marcos Freitas: 4–0
 Tomokazu Harimoto: 4–2
 Gao Ning: 10–0
 Hao Shuai: 20–9
 Jeoung Young-sik: 6–0
 Joo Se-Hyuk: 20–3
 Petr Korbel: 4–1
 Kalinikos Kreanga: 3–0
 Liang Jingkun: 6–1
 Lin Gaoyuan: 8–2
 Ma Lin: 30–14
 Michael Maze: 7–0
 Jun Mizutani: 16–0
 Oh Sang-eun: 9–2
 Dimitrij Ovtcharov: 19–0
 Ryu Seungmin: 7–3
 Vladimir Samsonov: 9–5
 Werner Schlager: 9–0
 Tang Peng: 14–0
 Wang Hao: 30–27
 Wang Liqin: 32–12
 Wong Chun Ting: 21–1
 Xu Xin: 32–14
 Yan An: 8–3
 Kaii Yoshida: 6–1
 Zhang Jike: 31–10
 Zhou Yu: 10–2

Other Records
 Went unbeaten for 40 singles matches in December 2011.
 Did not drop a single set in six tournaments: Swedish Open 2011, 2012 WTTC, World Team Classic 2013, 2014 and 2016 WTTC.
 In singles, he has won the World Tour Grand Finals six times, the China Open eight times, the German Open five times, the Qatar Open four times, the Asian Championships three times, and the Asian Cup four times, the most ever.
 One of two players to sweep all four medals in an Asian Championship (Fan Zhendong).
 Most ITTF World Tour singles titles (28) by a male player. 
 Most major titles (13) of any male player.
 First player to sweep his opponent in an Olympic Singles final since the Olympics extended matches to seven games in 2004.
 Second male player to win the World Championships, World Cup, Olympics, and World Tour Grand Finals. He is the first male player to be the defending champion of all four at the same time.
 Fastest player ever to win all possible singles titles (2,092 days, from 20 November 2010 to 11 August 2016).
 Fastest player ever to complete a "Full House" (467 days, from 3 May 2015 to 11 August 2016).
 First player, male or female, to win the ITTF Star Player of the Year award in consecutive years.
 Won at least one tournament at every major station on the ITTF World Tour.
 First and only male player to have won two consecutive singles titles at the China National Games.
 First player to win 3 Men's Singles titles in the World Championships since Wang Liqin. First player to win them consecutively since Zhuang Zedong.
 First male player to defend his Olympic Gold Medal in Singles.
 First male player to become a Double Grand Slam Winner.

International competitions (Results from the ITTF database)

See also
China at the 2012 Summer Olympics#Table tennis
Table tennis at the 2012 Summer Olympics – Men's team
China national table tennis team

References

External links

Career profile of Ma Long Table Tennis Master
Ma Long profile at Table Tennis Guide
Ma Long at Table Tennis Media
Ma Long Game records
Ma Long Technique and training videos

 
 

1988 births
Living people
Table tennis players from Anshan
Chinese male table tennis players
Olympic table tennis players of China
Medalists at the 2020 Summer Olympics
Olympic gold medalists for China
2016 Olympic gold medalists for China
Table tennis players at the 2012 Summer Olympics
Table tennis players at the 2016 Summer Olympics
Table tennis players at the 2020 Summer Olympics
Medalists at the 2012 Summer Olympics
Olympic medalists in table tennis
World Table Tennis Championships medalists
Table tennis players at the 2006 Asian Games
Table tennis players at the 2010 Asian Games
Table tennis players at the 2014 Asian Games
Asian Games medalists in table tennis
Asian Games gold medalists for China
Asian Games bronze medalists for China
Medalists at the 2006 Asian Games
Medalists at the 2010 Asian Games
Medalists at the 2014 Asian Games